The Alexander Dawson School at Rainbow Mountain is an independent, day school in Summerlin, Nevada. The Alexander Dawson School at Rainbow Mountain provides private, co-educational, secular education to over 520 students from preschool through eighth grade. It is often just called Dawson.

History
In 1996, the Alexander Dawson Foundation decided to open a school in the Las Vegas Valley, the Foundation's home for more than 30 years. Located on a  campus in Summerlin, the Alexander Dawson Foundation spent $58 million for the land, the school facilities, the interest expenses on the construction bonds, and in shortfall budget support during the school's early years. Ground was broken in 1999, and The Alexander Dawson School at Rainbow Mountain opened on September 6, 2000 with over 150 students from kindergarten through fifth grade.

From 2001 to 2003, the school expanded by adding sixth, seventh and eighth grades to the curriculum. A three-year-old preschool curriculum was added in 2009, and enrollment had grown to over 630 students.

Highlights
Academics

The school has an overall 8:1 student-to-faculty ratio, with students receiving regional, state and national awards and rankings in math, science and engineering and fine arts. The school offers Spanish in kindergarten through fourth grade, and three languages in Middle School (Spanish, French, and Mandarin).

Dawson Bears Athletics
 Boys and girls basketball, volleyball, flag football, track and field, cross-country, baseball, golf, and soccer through the Red Rock Athletic Conference
 Boys and girls tennis through the USTA
 Girls cheerleading
 Athletic Conference events include swimming

Financial aid and tuition assistance
 Over $1 million awarded each year in income-based financial assistance
 20 percent of students receive financial assistance
 Need-blind admissions process

Accreditation
The Alexander Dawson School at Rainbow Mountain is one of three private schools in Southern Nevada with national and regional accreditation. The school is a member of The National Association of Independent Schools (NAIS) and is accredited by The Northwest Association of Independent Schools (NWAIS). The Early Childhood Education Center, which houses the preschool and pre-kindergarten programs, is accredited by the National Association for the Education of Young Children (NAEYC).

Board of trustees
The Alexander Dawson School at Rainbow Mountain is governed by a board of trustees; five foundation trustees, Chairman Oz Gutsche, Kimberley Johnston, Hunter Campbell, Pearl Gallagher, Lisa Eyler, and Susan Borst; three volunteer parent trustees – Robert Glaser, Carla Van Kalsbeek, and Mindy Oliveri; and School Trustee Charlie Silvestri, who is a community education leader.

The board of trustees holds the school in trust and has a fiduciary obligation to safeguard the institution and its future well-being. According to the foundation's charter, the board's primary responsibilities include approving the school's annual budget and maintaining the authority to hire and fire the head of school. The board also assists the school in developing long-term strategies and school policies.

Alexander Dawson Foundation 
The Alexander Dawson Foundation is a 501(c)3 charity based in Paradise, Nevada.  The foundation supports two schools, this one officially known as The Alexander Dawson School at RM and The Alexander Dawson School CO.

References

External links
 Official website
 The Dawson School in Colorado: http://www.dawsonschool.org

Educational institutions established in 2000
Schools in Clark County, Nevada
Buildings and structures in Summerlin, Nevada
2000 establishments in Nevada
Private elementary schools in Nevada
Private middle schools in Nevada